Manchester Piccadilly may refer to:

Manchester Piccadilly station, a railway station in England
Manchester Piccadilly Gardens bus station, England
Piccadilly Gardens, green space in Manchester, England
Piccadilly Gardens tram stop on Manchester Metrolink
Piccadilly Radio, a former name of Greatest Hits Manchester, a radio station in Manchester, England
Piccadilly (ward), electoral ward of Manchester city council